Millie Miller (8 April 1922 – 29 October 1977) was a British Labour Party politician.

Miller was a councillor in the London Borough of Camden and was the first woman to lead a London Borough council when she became leader in 1971, remaining in the post until 1973. Earlier, she had been the Mayor of Camden and of Stoke Newington where she had been a councillor.

After coming second to the Conservative incumbent Thomas Iremonger in her first bid to become Member of Parliament for Ilford North in the February 1974 general election, Miller won the seat the following October. In 1977, she died in office at the age of 55. Her successor in the subsequent by-election was the Conservative Vivian Bendall.

References
Times Guide to the House of Commons October 1974

External links
 

1922 births
1977 deaths
Councillors in the London Borough of Camden
Councillors in the London Borough of Hackney
Female members of the Parliament of the United Kingdom for English constituencies
British Jews
Jewish British politicians
Jewish women politicians
Labour Party (UK) councillors
Labour Party (UK) MPs for English constituencies
Members of Stoke Newington Metropolitan Borough Council
UK MPs 1974–1979
20th-century British women politicians
Leaders of local authorities of England
20th-century English women
20th-century English people
Women councillors in England